The following species in the flowering plant genus Scutellaria, the skullcaps, are accepted by Plants of the World Online. Species are somewhat difficult to delineate by traditional morphological methods.

Scutellaria adenostegia 
Scutellaria adenotricha 
Scutellaria adsurgens 
Scutellaria agrestis 
Scutellaria alabamensis 
Scutellaria albida 
Scutellaria albituba 
Scutellaria alborosea 
Scutellaria alpina 
Scutellaria alta 
Scutellaria altaica 
Scutellaria altamaha 
Scutellaria altissima 
Scutellaria amabilis 
Scutellaria amicorum 
Scutellaria amoena 
Scutellaria amphichlora 
Scutellaria anatolica 
Scutellaria andamanica 
Scutellaria andrachnoides 
Scutellaria androssovii 
Scutellaria angrenica 
Scutellaria angustifolia 
Scutellaria anhweiensis 
Scutellaria anitae 
Scutellaria anomala 
Scutellaria antirrhinoides 
Scutellaria arabica 
Scutellaria arakensis 
Scutellaria aramberrana 
Scutellaria araxensis 
Scutellaria arenicola 
Scutellaria arguta 
Scutellaria ariana 
Scutellaria artvinensis 
Scutellaria asperiflora 
Scutellaria assamica 
Scutellaria atrocyanea 
Scutellaria attenuifolia 
Scutellaria aurantiaca 
Scutellaria aurata 
Scutellaria aurea 
Scutellaria axilliflora 
Scutellaria baicalensis 
Scutellaria baldshuanica 
Scutellaria balearica 
Scutellaria bambusetorum 
Scutellaria barbata 
Scutellaria bartlettii 
Scutellaria benthamiana 
Scutellaria blepharophylla 
Scutellaria bolanderi 
Scutellaria bornmuelleri 
Scutellaria botbaevae 
Scutellaria botschantzevii 
Scutellaria brachyspica 
Scutellaria brevibracteata 
Scutellaria brittonii 
Scutellaria bucharica 
Scutellaria bushii 
Scutellaria calcarata 
Scutellaria californica 
Scutellaria cardiophylla 
Scutellaria carmenensis 
Scutellaria caryopteroides 
Scutellaria catharinae 
Scutellaria caucasica 
Scutellaria caudifolia 
Scutellaria chaematochlora 
Scutellaria chalicophila 
Scutellaria chamaedrifolia 
Scutellaria chekiangensis 
Scutellaria chenopodiifolia 
Scutellaria chevalieri 
Scutellaria chiangii 
Scutellaria chihshuiensis 
Scutellaria chimenensis 
Scutellaria chodshakasiani 
Scutellaria chungtienensis 
Scutellaria × churchilliana 
Scutellaria coccinea 
Scutellaria cochinchinensis 
Scutellaria colebrookeana 
Scutellaria colpodea 
Scutellaria columnae 
Scutellaria comosa 
Scutellaria cordifolia 
Scutellaria cordifrons 
Scutellaria costaricana 
Scutellaria cristata 
Scutellaria cuatrecasasiana 
Scutellaria cuevasiana 
Scutellaria cyanocheila 
Scutellaria cylindriflora 
Scutellaria cypria 
Scutellaria daghestanica 
Scutellaria darriensis 
Scutellaria darvasica 
Scutellaria delavayi 
Scutellaria dependens 
Scutellaria diffusa 
Scutellaria discolor 
Scutellaria dombeyi 
Scutellaria drummondii 
Scutellaria dumetorum 
Scutellaria durangensis 
Scutellaria ebracteata 
Scutellaria edelbergii 
Scutellaria elliptica 
Scutellaria eplingii 
Scutellaria farsistanica 
Scutellaria fauriei 
Scutellaria fedschenkoi 
Scutellaria filicaulis 
Scutellaria flabellulata 
Scutellaria flocculosa 
Scutellaria floridana 
Scutellaria formosa 
Scutellaria formosana 
Scutellaria forrestii 
Scutellaria fragillima 
Scutellaria franchetiana 
Scutellaria fraxinea 
Scutellaria fruticetorum 
Scutellaria galericulata 
Scutellaria galerita 
Scutellaria gardoquioides 
Scutellaria gaumeri 
Scutellaria ghorana 
Scutellaria glabra 
Scutellaria glabrata 
Scutellaria glabriuscula 
Scutellaria glandulosa 
Scutellaria glaphymstachys 
Scutellaria glechomoides 
Scutellaria glutinosa 
Scutellaria gontscharovii 
Scutellaria goulimyi 
Scutellaria grandiflora 
Scutellaria granulosa 
Scutellaria grossa 
Scutellaria grossecrenata 
Scutellaria grossheimiana 
Scutellaria guatemalensis 
Scutellaria guilielmi 
Scutellaria guttata 
Scutellaria haesitabunda 
Scutellaria hainanensis 
Scutellaria hastifolia 
Scutellaria havanensis 
Scutellaria helenae 
Scutellaria heterophylla 
Scutellaria heterotricha 
Scutellaria heydei 
Scutellaria hintoniana 
Scutellaria hintoniorum 
Scutellaria hirta 
Scutellaria hispidula 
Scutellaria hissarica 
Scutellaria holguinensis 
Scutellaria holosericea 
Scutellaria honanensis 
Scutellaria hookeri 
Scutellaria hsiehii 
Scutellaria humilis 
Scutellaria hunanensis 
Scutellaria hypericifolia 
Scutellaria immaculata 
Scutellaria incana 
Scutellaria incarnata 
Scutellaria incisa 
Scutellaria incurva 
Scutellaria indica 
Scutellaria inflata 
Scutellaria inghokensis 
Scutellaria insignis 
Scutellaria integrifolia 
Scutellaria intermedia 
Scutellaria irrasa 
Scutellaria iskanderi 
Scutellaria isocheila 
Scutellaria iyoensis 
Scutellaria jaliscana 
Scutellaria javanica 
Scutellaria jodudiana 
Scutellaria juzepczukii 
Scutellaria kamelinii 
Scutellaria karatavica 
Scutellaria karjaginii 
Scutellaria karkaralensis 
Scutellaria × ketenoglui 
Scutellaria khaoyaiensis 
Scutellaria khasiana 
Scutellaria kikai-insularis 
Scutellaria kingiana 
Scutellaria kiusiana 
Scutellaria knorringiae 
Scutellaria kotkaiensis 
Scutellaria krasevii 
Scutellaria kugarti 
Scutellaria kujuensis 
Scutellaria kuromidakensis 
Scutellaria kurssanovii 
Scutellaria lacei 
Scutellaria lactea 
Scutellaria laeteviolacea 
Scutellaria laevis 
Scutellaria langbianensis 
Scutellaria lanipes 
Scutellaria lateriflora 
Scutellaria laxa 
Scutellaria leptosiphon 
Scutellaria leptostegia 
Scutellaria leucantha 
Scutellaria likiangensis 
Scutellaria lilungensis 
Scutellaria linarioides 
Scutellaria linczewskii 
Scutellaria lindbergii 
Scutellaria lindeniana 
Scutellaria linearis 
Scutellaria lipskyi 
Scutellaria litwinowii 
Scutellaria longifolia 
Scutellaria longituba 
Scutellaria lotienensis 
Scutellaria lundellii 
Scutellaria lushuiensis 
Scutellaria lutea 
Scutellaria luteocaerulea 
Scutellaria lutescens 
Scutellaria lutilabia 
Scutellaria macra 
Scutellaria macrochlamys 
Scutellaria macrodonta 
Scutellaria macrosiphon 
Scutellaria mairei 
Scutellaria maxonii 
Scutellaria meehanioides 
Scutellaria megalaspis 
Scutellaria megalodonta 
Scutellaria megaphylla 
Scutellaria mellichampii 
Scutellaria mesostegia 
Scutellaria mexicana 
Scutellaria microdasys 
Scutellaria microphylla 
Scutellaria microphysa 
Scutellaria microviolacea 
Scutellaria × minkwitziae 
Scutellaria minor 
Scutellaria mocinoana 
Scutellaria modesta 
Scutellaria molanguitensis 
Scutellaria molinarum 
Scutellaria mollifolia 
Scutellaria mollis 
Scutellaria mongolica 
Scutellaria moniliorhiza 
Scutellaria montana 
Scutellaria monterreyana 
Scutellaria mulleri 
Scutellaria multicaulis 
Scutellaria multiflora 
Scutellaria multiglandulosa 
Scutellaria multiramosa 
Scutellaria muramatsui 
Scutellaria muriculata 
Scutellaria muzquiziana 
Scutellaria nana 
Scutellaria navicularis 
Scutellaria nepetifolia 
Scutellaria nepetoides 
Scutellaria nervosa 
Scutellaria neubaueri 
Scutellaria × neumannii 
Scutellaria nevskii 
Scutellaria × nicholsonii 
Scutellaria nigricans 
Scutellaria nigrocardia 
Scutellaria novae-zelandiae 
Scutellaria novorossica 
Scutellaria nummulariifolia 
Scutellaria oaxacana 
Scutellaria oblonga 
Scutellaria oblongifolia 
Scutellaria obtusifolia 
Scutellaria ocellata 
Scutellaria ochotensis 
Scutellaria ocmulgee 
Scutellaria ocymoides 
Scutellaria oligodonta 
Scutellaria oligophlebia 
Scutellaria omeiensis 
Scutellaria orbicularis 
Scutellaria oreophila 
Scutellaria orichalcea 
Scutellaria orientalis 
Scutellaria orizabensis 
Scutellaria orthocalyx 
Scutellaria orthotricha 
Scutellaria oschtenica 
Scutellaria ossethica 
Scutellaria ovata 
Scutellaria oxystegia 
Scutellaria pacifica 
Scutellaria pallidiflora 
Scutellaria pamirica 
Scutellaria paradoxa 
Scutellaria parrae 
Scutellaria parvula 
Scutellaria patonii 
Scutellaria paulsenii 
Scutellaria pekinensis 
Scutellaria persica 
Scutellaria petersoniae 
Scutellaria petiolata 
Scutellaria phyllostachya 
Scutellaria physocalyx 
Scutellaria picta 
Scutellaria pingbienensis 
Scutellaria pinnatifida 
Scutellaria platensis 
Scutellaria platystegia 
Scutellaria platystoma 
Scutellaria playfairii 
Scutellaria poecilantha 
Scutellaria poliochlora 
Scutellaria polyadena 
Scutellaria polyadenia 
Scutellaria polyphylla 
Scutellaria polytricha 
Scutellaria pontica 
Scutellaria popovii 
Scutellaria porphyrantha 
Scutellaria potosina 
Scutellaria prilipkoana 
Scutellaria prostrata 
Scutellaria przewalskii 
Scutellaria pseudocoerulea 
Scutellaria pseudocoleus 
Scutellaria pseudoserrata 
Scutellaria pseudotenax 
Scutellaria purpurascens 
Scutellaria purpureocardia 
Scutellaria pycnoclada 
Scutellaria quadrilobulata 
Scutellaria racemosa 
Scutellaria raddeana 
Scutellaria ramosissima 
Scutellaria ramozanica 
Scutellaria regeliana 
Scutellaria rehderiana 
Scutellaria repens 
Scutellaria resinosa 
Scutellaria reticulata 
Scutellaria rhomboidalis 
Scutellaria robusta 
Scutellaria rosei 
Scutellaria roseocyanea 
Scutellaria rubicunda 
Scutellaria rubromaculata 
Scutellaria rubropunctata 
Scutellaria rupestris 
Scutellaria russelioides 
Scutellaria salviifolia 
Scutellaria sapphirina 
Scutellaria sarmentosa 
Scutellaria saslayensis 
Scutellaria saxatilis 
Scutellaria scandens 
Scutellaria schachristanica 
Scutellaria schugnanica 
Scutellaria schweinfurthii 
Scutellaria sciaphila 
Scutellaria scordiifolia 
Scutellaria scutellarioides 
Scutellaria sedelmeyerae 
Scutellaria seleriana 
Scutellaria semicircularis 
Scutellaria serboana 
Scutellaria serrata 
Scutellaria sessilifolia 
Scutellaria sevanensis 
Scutellaria shansiensis 
Scutellaria shikokiana 
Scutellaria shweliensis 
Scutellaria sibthorpii 
Scutellaria sichourensis 
Scutellaria sieberi 
Scutellaria sieversii 
Scutellaria siphocampyloides 
Scutellaria sipilensis 
Scutellaria slametensis 
Scutellaria somalensis 
Scutellaria sosnowskyi 
Scutellaria sporadum 
Scutellaria squarrosa 
Scutellaria stachyoides 
Scutellaria stenosiphon 
Scutellaria stewartii 
Scutellaria stocksii 
Scutellaria striatella 
Scutellaria strigillosa 
Scutellaria subcaespitosa 
Scutellaria subcordata 
Scutellaria subintegra 
Scutellaria sublitoralis 
Scutellaria suffrutescens 
Scutellaria supina 
Scutellaria swatensis 
Scutellaria szovitziana 
Scutellaria tabrisiana 
Scutellaria taiwanensis 
Scutellaria talamancana 
Scutellaria talassica 
Scutellaria tapintzensis 
Scutellaria tarokoensis 
Scutellaria tatianae 
Scutellaria tauricola 
Scutellaria tayloriana 
Scutellaria tenasserimensis 
Scutellaria tenax 
Scutellaria tenera 
Scutellaria teniana 
Scutellaria tenuiflora 
Scutellaria tenuipetiolata 
Scutellaria ternejica 
Scutellaria texana 
Scutellaria theobromina 
Scutellaria tienchuanensis 
Scutellaria titovii 
Scutellaria toguztoravensis 
Scutellaria tomentosa 
Scutellaria tortumensis 
Scutellaria tournefortii 
Scutellaria tsinyunensis 
Scutellaria tuberifera 
Scutellaria tuberosa 
Scutellaria tubiflora 
Scutellaria tucurriquensis 
Scutellaria tuminensis 
Scutellaria turgaica 
Scutellaria tutensis 
Scutellaria tuvensis 
Scutellaria uliginosa 
Scutellaria umbratilis 
Scutellaria urticifolia 
Scutellaria utriculata 
Scutellaria valdiviana 
Scutellaria velutina 
Scutellaria villosissima 
Scutellaria violacea 
Scutellaria violascens 
Scutellaria viscidula 
Scutellaria vitifolia 
Scutellaria volubilis 
Scutellaria weishanensis 
Scutellaria wendtii 
Scutellaria wenshanensis 
Scutellaria wightiana 
Scutellaria wongkei 
Scutellaria woodii 
Scutellaria wrightii 
Scutellaria wuana 
Scutellaria xanthosiphon 
Scutellaria xylorrhiza 
Scutellaria yangbiensis 
Scutellaria yezoensis 
Scutellaria yildirimlii 
Scutellaria yingtakensis 
Scutellaria yunnanensis 
Scutellaria yunyiana 
Scutellaria zaprjagaevii 
Scutellaria zivari

References

Scutellaria